The Georgian Governorate was one of the guberniyas of the Caucasus Viceroyalty of the Russian Empire. Its capital was Tiflis (Tbilisi). It was divided into uyezds of Gori, Dusheti (Its center was Tbilisi), Lori, Signagi and Telavi.

The Georgia governorate was established in 1801 following the Russian annexation of the Kingdom of Kartli-Kakheti.  In 1840 it was expanded to form the Georgia-Imeretia Governorate, incorporating the territory of the Imeretia Oblast (Its center was Kutaisi and was constituted from uzeyds of Kutaisi, Vakha, Rakvta (Raczyn during Russian rule), Sachkhere, Cheri and Bagdati) and Armenian Oblast (Its center was Erivan).

Caucasus Viceroyalty (1801–1917)
Governorates of the Caucasus
1800s in Georgia (country)
1820s in Georgia (country)
1840s in Georgia (country)
19th century in Georgia (country)
States and territories established in 1801
States and territories disestablished in 1840
1800s establishments in Georgia (country)
1840s disestablishments in Georgia (country)
1801 establishments in the Russian Empire
1840 disestablishments in the Russian Empire